Oliver Killeen (born 13 June 1937 in Ireland) is an international bigamist and fraudster.

He pretended to be a doctor of psychology in Waterford, Ireland for five years in the late 1990s, claiming to be a highly trained psychotherapist with university credentials from the United States and Canada. He became a well-known media personality in Ireland with radio, television and newspaper coverage, including authoring a syndicated column in 35 publications. He is believed to have been married 19 times. It is unclear if divorce was sought or received in any of those marriages. Killeen was convicted of bigamy in the United Kingdom in 2004, serving one and  a half years of a three-year sentence. 

Barbara Daniels, one of Killeen's many wives, filed a bigamy charge against him in Superior Court in Ontario. On March 1, 2012, Killeen pleaded guilty to the charge, and was sentenced to 90-days in jail (to be served on weekends). The prosecutor said Killeen’s age, his guilty plea and fact he is working were mitigating factors to be considered in sentencing.

In 2006 Agnieszka Piotrowska directed a documentary about Killeen for Channel Five titled Conman With 14 Wives (also broadcast as Trust Me I am a Conman in some areas) which led to a discovery of Killeen's subsequent bigamous marriage. A Canadian documentary series was made titled The Devil You Know created by Vancouver-based production company Make Believe Media. One of the episodes tells of Daniels' story of her marriage to Killeen and her daughter's legal battle to bring him to justice in Canada. It aired in Canada on Viva and on the Oprah Winfrey Network.

References

1937 births
Irish fraudsters
Living people
People convicted of bigamy
Irish people imprisoned abroad
Prisoners and detainees of Canada